Markus Lackner (born 5 April 1991) is an Austrian professional footballer who plays as a midfielder for Austrian Bundesliga club SV Ried.

Club career

Sturm Graz
Lackner joined SK Sturm Graz in July 2018. On 28 August 2019 he returned to Admira Wacker on loan for the 2019–20 season.

SV Ried
On 4 September 2020 he signed with SV Ried.

References

External links
Markus Lackner at Admira Wacker's website

Austrian footballers
Austrian Football Bundesliga players
2. Liga (Austria) players
1991 births
Living people
FC Admira Wacker Mödling players
First Vienna FC players
SV Horn players
SK Sturm Graz players
SV Ried players
Association football midfielders